The WABA Champions Cup 2002 was the 5th staging of the WABA Champions Cup, the basketball club tournament of West Asia Basketball Association. The tournament was held in Beirut, Lebanon between March 8 and March 10. The winner qualify for the 2002 ABC Champions Cup.

Sagesse from Lebanon won the tournament by a 3–0 record and advanced to the final round in Kuala Lumpur.

Standings

Results

References
www.sagessefans.com

2002
International basketball competitions hosted by Lebanon
2001–02 in Asian basketball
2001–02 in Lebanese basketball
2001–02 in Jordanian basketball
2001–02 in Iranian basketball
2002 in Iraqi sport
WABA